Badmaash may refer to:

 Badmaash (1998 film), an Indian Bollywood film
 Badmaash (2016 film), an Indian Kannada romantic thriller film

See also
 Maha Badmaash, 1977 Indian Bollywood film
 Badmaash Company,  2010  Indian Bollywood film
 Brown Badmaash Dance Company, South Asian fusion dance team